Perieți is a commune in Olt County, Muntenia, Romania. It is composed of three villages: Măgura, Mierleștii de Sus and Perieți.

References

Communes in Olt County
Localities in Muntenia